Scrophulariaceae is a family of flowering plants (anthophytes) in the order Lamiales, commonly known as the figwort family.  The plants are annual and perennial herbs, as well as one genus of shrubs.  Flowers have bilateral (zygomorphic) or rarely radial  (actinomorphic) symmetry.  The Scrophulariaceae have a cosmopolitan distribution, with the majority found in temperate areas, including tropical mountains.  The family name is based on the name of the included genus Scrophularia L.

23,420 species of vascular plant have been recorded in South Africa, making it the sixth most species-rich country in the world and the most species-rich country on the African continent. Of these, 153 species are considered to be threatened. Nine biomes have been described in South Africa: Fynbos, Succulent Karoo, desert, Nama Karoo, grassland, savanna, Albany thickets, the Indian Ocean coastal belt, and forests.

The 2018 South African National Biodiversity Institute's National Biodiversity Assessment plant checklist lists 35,130 taxa in the phyla Anthocerotophyta (hornworts (6)), Anthophyta (flowering plants (33534)), Bryophyta (mosses (685)), Cycadophyta (cycads (42)), Lycopodiophyta (Lycophytes(45)), Marchantiophyta (liverworts (376)), Pinophyta (conifers (33)), and Pteridophyta (cryptogams (408)).

65 genera are represented in the literature. Listed taxa include species, subspecies, varieties, and forms as recorded, some of which have subsequently been allocated to other taxa as synonyms, in which cases the accepted taxon is appended to the listing. Multiple entries under alternative names reflect taxonomic revision over time.

Agathelpis 
Genus Agathelpis:
 Agathelpis dubia (L.) Hutch. ex Wijnands, accepted as Microdon dubius (L.) Hilliard, present
 Agathelpis nitida E.Mey. accepted as Microdon nitidus (E.Mey.) Hilliard, present

Alonsoa 
Genus Alonsoa:
 Alonsoa peduncularis (Kunze) Wettst. endemic
 Alonsoa unilabiata (L.f.) Steud. endemic

Antherothamnus 
Genus Antherothamnus:
 Antherothamnus pearsonii N.E.Br. indigenous

Anticharis 
Genus Anticharis:
 Anticharis linearis (Benth.) Hochst. ex Asch. accepted as Anticharis senegalensis (Walp.) Bhandari, present
 Anticharis scoparia (E.Mey. ex Benth.) Hiern ex Benth. & Hook.f. indigenous
 Anticharis senegalensis (Walp.) Bhandari, indigenous

Aptosimum 
Genus Aptosimum:
 Aptosimum albomarginatum Marloth & Engl. indigenous
 Aptosimum elongatum Engl. indigenous
 Aptosimum indivisum Burch. ex Benth. indigenous
 Aptosimum junceum (Hiern) Philcox, accepted as Peliostomum junceum (Hiern) Kolberg & Van Slageren, indigenous
 Aptosimum leucorrhizum (E.Mey. ex Benth.) E.Phillips, accepted as Peliostomum leucorrhizum E.Mey. ex Benth. indigenous
 Aptosimum lineare Marloth & Engl. indigenous
 Aptosimum lugardiae (N.E.Br. ex Hemsl. & Skan) E.Phillips, accepted as Peliostomum leucorrhizum E.Mey. ex Benth. indigenous
 Aptosimum marlothii (Engl.) Hiern, indigenous
 Aptosimum neglectum Emil Weber, indigenous
 Aptosimum patulum Bremek. endemic
 Aptosimum procumbens (Lehm.) Steud. indigenous
 Aptosimum spinescens (Thunb.) Emil Weber, indigenous
 Aptosimum tragacanthoides E.Mey. ex Benth. indigenous
 Aptosimum transvaalense Emil Weber, endemic
 Aptosimum viscosum Benth. indigenous

Buddleja 
Genus Buddleja:
 Buddleja auriculata Benth. indigenous
 Buddleja davidii Franch. not indigenous, naturalised, invasive
 Buddleja dysophylla (Benth.) Radlk. indigenous
 Buddleja glomerata H.L.Wendl. endemic
 Buddleja loricata Leeuwenb. indigenous
 Buddleja madagascariensis Lam. not indigenous, naturalised, invasive
 Buddleja pulchella N.E.Br. indigenous
 Buddleja saligna Willd. indigenous
 Buddleja salviifolia (L.) Lam. indigenous

Capraria 
Genus Capraria:
 Capraria salicifolia Hort. ex Benth., accepted as Freylinia lanceolata (L.f.) G.Don, present

Chaenostoma 
Genus Chaenostoma:
 Chaenostoma aethiopicum (L.) Benth. endemic
 Chaenostoma affine Bernh. endemic
 Chaenostoma archeri (Compton) Kornhall, endemic
 Chaenostoma caeruleum (L.f.) Kornhall, endemic
 Chaenostoma calciphilum (Hilliard) Kornhall, endemic
 Chaenostoma calycinum Benth. endemic
 Chaenostoma campanulatum Benth. endemic
 Chaenostoma cinereum (Hilliard) Kornhall, endemic
 Chaenostoma comptonii (Hilliard) Kornhall, endemic
 Chaenostoma cordatum (Thunb.) Benth. endemic
 Chaenostoma cuneatum Benth., accepted as Chaenostoma hispidum (Thunb.) Benth. 
 Chaenostoma debile (Hutch.) Kornhall, indigenous
 Chaenostoma decipiens (Hilliard) Kornhall, endemic
 Chaenostoma denudatum Benth. endemic
 Chaenostoma fastigiatum Benth. accepted as Chaenostoma aethiopicum (L.) Benth. 
 Chaenostoma fastigiatum Benth. var. glabratum Benth. accepted as Chaenostoma aethiopicum (L.) Benth. 
 Chaenostoma floribundum Benth. indigenous
 Chaenostoma glabratum Benth. endemic
 Chaenostoma glanduliferum (Hilliard) Kornhall, endemic
 Chaenostoma halimifolium Benth. indigenous
 Chaenostoma hispidum (Thunb.) Benth. endemic
 Chaenostoma impeditum (Hilliard) Kornhall, endemic
 Chaenostoma integrifolium (L.f.) Benth. endemic
 Chaenostoma langebergense (Hilliard) Kornhall, endemic
 Chaenostoma leve (Hiern) Kornhall, indigenous
 Chaenostoma linifolium (Thunb.) Benth. accepted as Chaenostoma uncinatum (Desr.) Kornhall 
 Chaenostoma linifolium (Thunb.) Benth. var. hispidum Bernh. accepted as Chaenostoma uncinatum (Desr.) Kornhall 
 Chaenostoma longipedicellatum (Hilliard) Kornhall, endemic
 Chaenostoma macrosiphon Schltr. endemic
 Chaenostoma marifolium Benth. endemic
 Chaenostoma multiramosum (Hilliard) Kornhall, endemic
 Chaenostoma neglectum J.M.Wood & M.S.Evans, indigenous
 Chaenostoma paniculatum (Hilliard) Kornhall, endemic
 Chaenostoma patrioticum (Hiern) Kornhall, indigenous
 Chaenostoma pauciflorum Benth. endemic
 Chaenostoma placidum (Hilliard) Kornhall, endemic
 Chaenostoma platysepalum (Hiern) Kornhall, endemic
 Chaenostoma polelense (Hiern) Kornhall, indigenous
 Chaenostoma polelense (Hiern) Kornhall subsp. fraterna (Hilliard) Kornhall, indigenous
 Chaenostoma polelense (Hiern) Kornhall subsp. polelense, indigenous
 Chaenostoma polyanthum Benth. endemic
 Chaenostoma procumbens Benth. accepted as Chaenostoma polyanthum Benth. 
 Chaenostoma pumilum Benth. accepted as Chaenostoma halimifolium Benth. 
 Chaenostoma racemosum Benth., endemic
 Chaenostoma revolutum (Thunb.) Benth. endemic
 Chaenostoma roseoflavum (Hiern) Kornhall, endemic
 Chaenostoma rotundifolium Benth. endemic
 Chaenostoma subnudum N.E.Br. endemic
 Chaenostoma subsessile (Hilliard) Kornhall, endemic
 Chaenostoma subspicatum Benth. endemic
 Chaenostoma tenuicaule (Hilliard) Kornhall, endemic
 Chaenostoma titanophilum (Hilliard) Kornhall, endemic
 Chaenostoma uncinatum (Desr.) Kornhall, endemic
 Chaenostoma violaceum Schltr. endemic

Chamaecrypta 
Genus Chamaecrypta:
 Chamaecrypta diasciifolia Schltr. & Diels, endemic

Chenopodiopsis 
Genus Chenopodiopsis:
 Chenopodiopsis chenopodioides (Diels) Hilliard, endemic
 Chenopodiopsis hirta (L.f.) Hilliard, endemic
 Chenopodiopsis retrorsa Hilliard, endemic

Colpias 
Genus Colpias:
 Colpias mollis E.Mey. ex Benth. endemic

Cromidon 
Genus Cromidon:
 Cromidon austerum Hilliard, endemic
 Cromidon confusum Hilliard, endemic
 Cromidon corrigioloides (Rolfe) Compton, endemic
 Cromidon decumbens (Thunb.) Hilliard, endemic
 Cromidon dregei Hilliard, endemic
 Cromidon gracile Hilliard, endemic
 Cromidon hamulosum (E.Mey.) Hilliard, endemic
 Cromidon microechinos Hilliard, endemic
 Cromidon minutum (Rolfe) Hilliard, indigenous
 Cromidon plantaginis (L.f.) Hilliard, endemic
 Cromidon varicalyx Hilliard, endemic

Dermatobotrys 
Genus Dermatobotrys:
 Dermatobotrys saundersii Bolus ex Oliv. endemic

Diascia 
Genus Diascia:
 Diascia aliciae Hiern, endemic
 Diascia alonsooides Benth. endemic
 Diascia anastrepta Hilliard & B.L.Burtt, indigenous
 Diascia appendiculata K.E.Steiner, endemic
 Diascia austromontana K.E.Steiner, indigenous
 Diascia avasmontana Dinter, accepted as Chaenostoma patrioticum (Hiern) Kornhall 
 Diascia barberae Hook.f. indigenous
 Diascia batteniana K.E.Steiner, endemic
 Diascia bergiana Link & Otto, endemic
 Diascia bicolor K.E.Steiner, endemic
 Diascia caitliniae K.E.Steiner, indigenous
 Diascia capensis (L.) Britten, endemic
 Diascia capsularis Benth. indigenous
 Diascia cardiosepala Hiern, endemic
 Diascia collina K.E.Steiner, endemic
 Diascia cordata N.E.Br. indigenous
 Diascia cuneata E.Mey. ex Benth. endemic
 Diascia decipiens K.E.Steiner, endemic
 Diascia dielsiana Schltr. ex Hiern, endemic
 Diascia diffusa Benth. endemic
 Diascia dissecta Hiern, accepted as Alonsoa unilabiata (L.f.) Steud. present
 Diascia dissimulans Hilliard & B.L.Burtt, endemic
 Diascia ellaphieae K.E.Steiner, endemic
 Diascia elongata Benth. endemic
 Diascia engleri Diels, indigenous
 Diascia esterhuyseniae K.E.Steiner, endemic
 Diascia fetcaniensis Hilliard & B.L.Burtt, indigenous
 Diascia fragrans K.E.Steiner, endemic
 Diascia glandulosa E.Phillips, indigenous
 Diascia glandulosa E.Phillips var. albiflora E.Phillips, endemic
 Diascia glandulosa E.Phillips var. glandulosa, endemic
 Diascia gracilis Schltr. endemic
 Diascia heterandra Benth. accepted as Alonsoa unilabiata (L.f.) Steud. present
 Diascia hexensis K.E.Steiner, endemic
 Diascia humilis K.E.Steiner, endemic
 Diascia insignis K.E.Steiner, endemic
 Diascia integerrima E.Mey. ex Benth. indigenous
 Diascia lewisiae K.E.Steiner, endemic
 Diascia lilacina Hilliard & B.L.Burtt, endemic
 Diascia longicornis (Thunb.) Druce, endemic
 Diascia macrophylla (Thunb.) Spreng. endemic
 Diascia maculata K.E.Steiner, endemic
 Diascia megathura Hilliard & B.L.Burtt, indigenous
 Diascia minutiflora Hiern, indigenous
 Diascia mollis Hilliard & B.L.Burtt, endemic
 Diascia namaquensis Hiern, endemic
 Diascia nana Diels, endemic
 Diascia nodosa K.E.Steiner, indigenous
 Diascia nutans Diels, accepted as Alonsoa unilabiata (L.f.) Steud. present
 Diascia pachyceras E.Mey. ex Benth. endemic
 Diascia parviflora Benth. endemic
 Diascia patens (Thunb.) Grant ex Fourc. endemic
 Diascia pentheri Schltr. endemic
 Diascia personata Hilliard & B.L.Burtt, endemic
 Diascia purpurea N.E.Br. indigenous
 Diascia pusilla K.E.Steiner, endemic
 Diascia racemulosa Benth. endemic
 Diascia ramosa Scott-Elliot, endemic
 Diascia rigescens E.Mey. ex Benth. endemic
 Diascia rudolphii Hiern, endemic
 Diascia runcinata E.Mey. ex Benth. indigenous
 Diascia sacculata Benth. endemic
 Diascia scullyi Hiern, accepted as Hemimeris racemosa (Houtt.) Merr. present
 Diascia stachyoides Schltr. ex Hiern, indigenous
 Diascia stricta Hilliard & B.L.Burtt, endemic
 Diascia tanyceras E.Mey. ex Benth. endemic
 Diascia transkeiana Hilliard & B.L.Burtt, accepted as Diascia mollis Hilliard & B.L.Burtt, present
 Diascia tugelensis Hilliard & B.L.Burtt, endemic
 Diascia unilabiata (L.f.) Benth. accepted as Alonsoa unilabiata (L.f.) Steud. present
 Diascia veronicoides Schltr. endemic
 Diascia vigilis Hilliard & B.L.Burtt, indigenous

Diclis 
Genus Diclis:
 Diclis petiolaris Benth. indigenous
 Diclis reptans Benth. indigenous
 Diclis rotundifolia (Hiern) Hilliard & B.L.Burtt, indigenous
 Diclis stellarioides Hiern, endemic

Dischisma 
Genus Dischisma:
 Dischisma arenarium E.Mey. endemic
 Dischisma capitatum (Thunb.) Choisy, endemic
 Dischisma ciliatum (P.J.Bergius) Choisy, indigenous
 Dischisma ciliatum (P.J.Bergius) Choisy subsp. ciliatum, endemic
 Dischisma ciliatum (P.J.Bergius) Choisy subsp. erinoides (L.f.) Roessler, endemic
 Dischisma ciliatum (P.J.Bergius) Choisy subsp. flaccum (E.Mey.) Roessler, endemic
 Dischisma clandestinum E.Mey., endemic
 Dischisma crassum Rolfe, endemic
 Dischisma fruticosum (L.f.) Rolfe, endemic
 Dischisma leptostachyum E.Mey. endemic
 Dischisma spicatum (Thunb.) Choisy, indigenous
 Dischisma squarrosum Schltr. endemic
 Dischisma struthioloides Killick, endemic
 Dischisma tomentosum Schltr. endemic

Freylinia 
Genus Freylinia:
 Freylinia crispa Van Jaarsv. endemic
 Freylinia decurrens Levyns ex Van Jaarsv. accepted as Freylinia densiflora Benth. present
 Freylinia densiflora Benth. endemic
 Freylinia helmei Van Jaarsv. endemic
 Freylinia lanceolata (L.f.) G.Don, endemic
 Freylinia longiflora Benth. endemic
 Freylinia tropica S.Moore, indigenous
 Freylinia undulata (L.f.) Benth. endemic
 Freylinia visseri Van Jaarsv. endemic
 Freylinia vlokii Van Jaarsv. endemic

Glekia 
Genus Glekia:
 Glekia krebsiana (Benth.) Hilliard, indigenous

Globulariopsis 
Genus Globulariopsis:
 Globulariopsis adpressa (Choisy) Hilliard, endemic
 Globulariopsis montana Hilliard, endemic
 Globulariopsis obtusiloba Hilliard, endemic
 Globulariopsis pumila Hilliard, endemic
 Globulariopsis stricta (P.J.Bergius) Hilliard, endemic
 Globulariopsis tephrodes (E.Mey.) Hilliard, endemic
 Globulariopsis wittebergensis Compton, endemic

Glumicalyx 
Genus Glumicalyx:
 Glumicalyx apiculatus (E.Mey.) Hilliard & B.L.Burtt, endemic
 Glumicalyx flanaganii (Hiern) Hilliard & B.L.Burtt, indigenous
 Glumicalyx goseloides (Diels) Hilliard & B.L.Burtt, endemic
 Glumicalyx montanus Hiern, indigenous
 Glumicalyx nutans (Rolfe) Hilliard & B.L.Burtt, indigenous

Gomphostigma 
Genus Gomphostigma:
 Gomphostigma incomptum (L.f.) N.E.Br. endemic
 Gomphostigma virgatum (L.f.) Baill. indigenous

Gosela 
Genus Gosela:
 Gosela eckloniana Choisy, endemic

Gratiola 
Genus Gratiola:
 Gratiola parviflora Roxb. accepted as Lindernia parviflora (Roxb.) Haines, indigenous

Hebenstretia 
Genus Hebenstretia:
 Hebenstretia angolensis Rolfe, indigenous
 Hebenstretia anomala Roessler, endemic
 Hebenstretia comosa Hochst. indigenous
 Hebenstretia cordata L. indigenous
 Hebenstretia dentata L. endemic
 Hebenstretia dregei Rolfe, endemic
 Hebenstretia dura Choisy, indigenous
 Hebenstretia fastigiosa Jaroscz, endemic
 Hebenstretia glaucescens Schltr. endemic
 Hebenstretia hamulosa E.Mey. endemic
 Hebenstretia holubii Rolfe, accepted as Hebenstretia angolensis Rolfe 
 Hebenstretia integrifolia L. indigenous
 Hebenstretia kamiesbergensis Roessler, endemic
 Hebenstretia lanceolata (E.Mey.) Rolfe, endemic
 Hebenstretia minutiflora Rolfe, indigenous
 Hebenstretia namaquensis Roessler, indigenous
 Hebenstretia neglecta Roessler, endemic
 Hebenstretia oatesii Rolfe, indigenous
 Hebenstretia oatesii Rolfe subsp. oatesii, indigenous
 Hebenstretia oatesii Rolfe subsp. rhodesiana Roessler, indigenous
 Hebenstretia paarlensis Roessler, endemic
 Hebenstretia parviflora E.Mey. indigenous
 Hebenstretia ramosissima Jaroscz, endemic
 Hebenstretia rehmannii Rolfe, endemic
 Hebenstretia repens Jaroscz, endemic
 Hebenstretia robusta E.Mey. endemic
 Hebenstretia sarcocarpa Bolus ex Rolfe, endemic

Hemimeris 
Genus Hemimeris:
 Hemimeris centrodes Hiern, endemic
 Hemimeris gracilis Schltr. endemic
 Hemimeris montana L.f. accepted as Hemimeris racemosa (Houtt.) Merr. present
 Hemimeris racemosa (Houtt.) Merr. endemic
 Hemimeris sabulosa L.f. endemic

Jamesbrittenia 
Genus Jamesbrittenia:
 Jamesbrittenia accrescens (Hiern) Hilliard, endemic
 Jamesbrittenia adpressa (Dinter) Hilliard, indigenous
 Jamesbrittenia albanensis Hilliard, endemic
 Jamesbrittenia albiflora (I.Verd.) Hilliard, endemic
 Jamesbrittenia albomarginata Hilliard, endemic
 Jamesbrittenia amplexicaulis (Benth.) Hilliard, endemic
 Jamesbrittenia argentea (L.f.) Hilliard, endemic
 Jamesbrittenia aridicola Hilliard, indigenous
 Jamesbrittenia aspalathoides (Benth.) Hilliard, endemic
 Jamesbrittenia aspleniifolia Hilliard, indigenous
 Jamesbrittenia atropurpurea (Benth.) Hilliard, indigenous
 Jamesbrittenia atropurpurea (Benth.) Hilliard subsp. atropurpurea, indigenous
 Jamesbrittenia atropurpurea (Benth.) Hilliard subsp. pubescens Hilliard, indigenous
 Jamesbrittenia aurantiaca (Burch.) Hilliard, indigenous
 Jamesbrittenia bergae Lemmer, endemic
 Jamesbrittenia breviflora (Schltr.) Hilliard, indigenous
 Jamesbrittenia burkeana (Benth.) Hilliard, indigenous
 Jamesbrittenia calciphila Hilliard, endemic
 Jamesbrittenia candida Hilliard, endemic
 Jamesbrittenia canescens (Benth.) Hilliard, indigenous
 Jamesbrittenia canescens (Benth.) Hilliard var. canescens, indigenous
 Jamesbrittenia canescens (Benth.) Hilliard var. seineri (Pilg.) Hilliard, indigenous
 Jamesbrittenia crassicaulis (Benth.) Hilliard, endemic
 Jamesbrittenia dentatisepala (Overkott) Hilliard, indigenous
 Jamesbrittenia filicaulis (Benth.) Hilliard, indigenous
 Jamesbrittenia foliolosa (Benth.) Hilliard, endemic
 Jamesbrittenia fruticosa (Benth.) Hilliard, indigenous
 Jamesbrittenia glutinosa (Benth.) Hilliard, indigenous
 Jamesbrittenia grandiflora (Galpin) Hilliard, indigenous
 Jamesbrittenia huillana (Diels) Hilliard, indigenous
 Jamesbrittenia incisa (Thunb.) Hilliard, indigenous
 Jamesbrittenia integerrima (Benth.) Hilliard, indigenous
 Jamesbrittenia kraussiana (Bernh.) Hilliard, endemic
 Jamesbrittenia macrantha (Codd) Hilliard, endemic
 Jamesbrittenia major (Pilg.) Hilliard, indigenous
 Jamesbrittenia maritima (Hiern) Hilliard, endemic
 Jamesbrittenia maxii (Hiern) Hilliard, indigenous
 Jamesbrittenia megadenia Hilliard, indigenous
 Jamesbrittenia megaphylla Hilliard, indigenous
 Jamesbrittenia merxmuelleri (Roessler) Hilliard, indigenous
 Jamesbrittenia micrantha (Klotzsch) Hilliard, indigenous
 Jamesbrittenia microphylla (L.f.) Hilliard, endemic
 Jamesbrittenia montana (Diels) Hilliard, indigenous
 Jamesbrittenia multisecta Hilliard, endemic
 Jamesbrittenia namaquensis Hilliard, endemic
 Jamesbrittenia pedunculosa (Benth.) Hilliard, endemic
 Jamesbrittenia phlogiflora (Benth.) Hilliard, endemic
 Jamesbrittenia pinnatifida (L.f.) Hilliard, endemic
 Jamesbrittenia pristisepala (Hiern) Hilliard, indigenous
 Jamesbrittenia racemosa (Benth.) Hilliard, endemic
 Jamesbrittenia ramosissima (Hiern) Hilliard, indigenous
 Jamesbrittenia silenoides (Hilliard) Hilliard, endemic
 Jamesbrittenia stellata Hilliard, endemic
 Jamesbrittenia stricta (Benth.) Hilliard, indigenous
 Jamesbrittenia tenella (Hiern) Hilliard, indigenous
 Jamesbrittenia tenuifolia (Bernh.) Hilliard, endemic
 Jamesbrittenia thunbergii (G.Don) Hilliard, endemic
 Jamesbrittenia tortuosa (Benth.) Hilliard, endemic
 Jamesbrittenia tysonii (Hiern) Hilliard, endemic
 Jamesbrittenia zuurbergensis Hilliard, endemic

Limosella 
Genus Limosella:
 Limosella africana Gluck, indigenous
 Limosella africana Gluck var. africana, indigenous
 Limosella africana Gluck var. macrosperma Gluck, indigenous
 Limosella aquatica L. indigenous
 Limosella australis R.Br. indigenous
 Limosella coerulea Burch. accepted as Limosella grandiflora Benth. present
 Limosella grandiflora Benth. indigenous
 Limosella inflata Hilliard & B.L.Burtt, indigenous
 Limosella longiflora Kuntze, indigenous
 Limosella maior Diels, indigenous
 Limosella natans Spreng. ex Drege, accepted as Limosella grandiflora Benth. 
 Limosella pretoriensis Suess. endemic
 Limosella vesiculosa Hilliard & B.L.Burtt, indigenous

Lyperia 
Genus Lyperia:
 Lyperia antirrhinoides (L.f.) Hilliard, endemic
 Lyperia formosa Hilliard, endemic
 Lyperia lychnidea (L.) Druce, endemic
 Lyperia tenuiflora Benth. endemic
 Lyperia tristis (L.f.) Benth. indigenous
 Lyperia violacea (Link ex Jaroscz) Benth. endemic

Manulea 
Genus Manulea:
 Manulea acutiloba Hilliard, endemic
 Manulea adenocalyx Hilliard, endemic
 Manulea adenodes Hilliard, endemic
 Manulea aethiopica (L.) Thunb. accepted as Chaenostoma aethiopicum (L.) Benth. 
 Manulea altissima L.f. indigenous
 Manulea altissima L.f. subsp. altissima, endemic
 Manulea altissima L.f. subsp. glabricaulis (Hiern) Hilliard, endemic
 Manulea altissima L.f. subsp. longifolia (Benth.) Hilliard, endemic
 Manulea androsacea E.Mey. ex Benth. indigenous
 Manulea angustifolia Link & Otto, accepted as Manulea rubra (P.J.Bergius) L.f. present
 Manulea annua (Hiern) Hilliard, endemic
 Manulea arabidea Schltr. ex Hiern, endemic
 Manulea aridicola Hilliard, indigenous
 Manulea augei (Hiern) Hilliard, endemic
 Manulea bellidifolia Benth. endemic
 Manulea benthamiana Hiern, accepted as Manulea corymbosa L.f. present
 Manulea buchneroides Hilliard & B.L.Burtt, indigenous
 Manulea burchellii Hiern, indigenous
 Manulea caerulea L.f. accepted as Chaenostoma caeruleum (L.f.) Kornhall 
 Manulea calciphila Hilliard, endemic
 Manulea caledonica Hilliard, endemic
 Manulea campestris Hiern, accepted as Manulea gariepina Benth. present
 Manulea cephalotes Thunb. endemic
 Manulea cheiranthus (L.) L. endemic
 Manulea chrysantha Hilliard, endemic
 Manulea cinerea Hilliard, endemic
 Manulea cordata Thunb. accepted as Chaenostoma cordatum (Thunb.) Benth. 
 Manulea corymbosa L.f. endemic
 Manulea crassifolia Benth. subsp. crassifolia, indigenous
 Manulea crassifolia Benth. subsp. thodeana (Diels) Hilliard, indigenous
 Manulea decipiens Hilliard, endemic
 Manulea densiflora Benth. accepted as Manulea cephalotes Thunb. present
 Manulea derustiana Hilliard, endemic
 Manulea deserticola Hilliard, endemic
 Manulea diandra Hilliard, endemic
 Manulea dregei Hilliard & B.L.Burtt, indigenous
 Manulea exigua Hilliard, endemic
 Manulea flanaganii Hilliard, endemic
 Manulea floribunda (Benth.) Kuntze, accepted as Chaenostoma floribundum Benth. 
 Manulea florifera Hilliard & B.L.Burtt, endemic
 Manulea fragrans Schltr. endemic
 Manulea gariepina Benth. indigenous
 Manulea gariepina Benth. subsp. campestris (Hiern) Roessler, accepted as Manulea gariepina Benth. present
 Manulea gariesiana Hilliard, endemic
 Manulea glandulosa E.Phillips, endemic
 Manulea halimifolia (Benth.) Kuntze, accepted as Chaenostoma halimifolium Benth. 
 Manulea hispida Thunb. accepted as Chaenostoma hispidum (Thunb.) Benth. 
 Manulea incana Thunb. endemic
 Manulea incisiflora Hiern, accepted as Manulea silenoides E.Mey. ex Benth. present
 Manulea integrifolia L.f. accepted as Chaenostoma integrifolium (L.f.) Benth. 
 Manulea juncea Benth. endemic
 Manulea karrooica Hilliard, endemic
 Manulea latiloba Hilliard, endemic
 Manulea laxa Schltr. endemic
 Manulea leiostachys Benth. endemic
 Manulea leptosiphon Thell. indigenous
 Manulea linearifolia Hilliard, endemic
 Manulea linifolia Thunb. accepted as Chaenostoma uncinatum (Desr.) Kornhall 
 Manulea minor Diels, endemic
 Manulea minuscula Hilliard, indigenous
 Manulea montana Hilliard, endemic
 Manulea multispicata Hilliard, endemic
 Manulea nervosa E.Mey. ex Benth. endemic
 Manulea obovata Benth. endemic
 Manulea obtusa Hiern, endemic
 Manulea oppositiflora Vent. accepted as Chaenostoma hispidum (Thunb.) Benth. 
 Manulea oppositiflora Vent. var. angustifolia Kuntze, accepted as Chaenostoma halimifolium Benth. 
 Manulea ovatifolia Hilliard, endemic
 Manulea paniculata Benth. indigenous
 Manulea parviflora Benth. indigenous
 Manulea parviflora Benth. var. limonioides (Conrath) Hilliard, endemic
 Manulea parviflora Benth. var. parviflora, indigenous
 Manulea paucibarbata Hilliard, endemic
 Manulea pillansii Hilliard, endemic
 Manulea plurirosulata Hilliard, endemic
 Manulea praeterita Hilliard, endemic
 Manulea psilostoma Hilliard, endemic
 Manulea pusilla E.Mey. ex Benth. endemic
 Manulea ramulosa Hilliard, endemic
 Manulea rhodantha Hilliard, indigenous
 Manulea rhodantha Hilliard subsp. aurantiaca Hilliard, endemic
 Manulea rhodantha Hilliard subsp. rhodantha, indigenous
 Manulea rigida Benth., endemic
 Manulea robusta Pilg. indigenous
 Manulea rotata Desr. accepted as Chaenostoma caeruleum (L.f.) Kornhall 
 Manulea rubra (P.J.Bergius) L.f. endemic
 Manulea rubra (P.J.Bergius) L.f. var. turritis (Benth.) Hiern, accepted as Manulea turritis Benth. present
 Manulea schaeferi Pilg. indigenous
 Manulea silenoides E.Mey. ex Benth. endemic
 Manulea stellata Benth. endemic
 Manulea thyrsiflora L.f. endemic
 Manulea thyrsiflora L.f. var. versicolor Kuntze, accepted as Chaenostoma floribundum Benth. 
 Manulea tomentosa (L.) L., endemic
 Manulea turritis Benth. endemic
 Manulea uncinata Desr. accepted as Chaenostoma uncinatum (Desr.) Kornhall 
 Manulea virgata Thunb. endemic
 Manulea viscosa (Aiton) Willd. accepted as Chaenostoma caeruleum (L.f.) Kornhall

Melanospermum 
Genus Melanospermum:
 Melanospermum foliosum (Benth.) Hilliard, indigenous
 Melanospermum italae Hilliard, indigenous
 Melanospermum rudolfii Hilliard, endemic
 Melanospermum rupestre (Hiern) Hilliard, endemic
 Melanospermum swazicum Hilliard, indigenous
 Melanospermum transvaalense (Hiern) Hilliard, endemic

Microdon 
Genus Microdon:
 Microdon bracteatus (Thunb.) I.H.Hartley, accepted as Microdon parviflorus (P.J.Bergius) Hilliard, present
 Microdon capitatus (P.J.Bergius) Levyns, endemic
 Microdon cylindricus E.Mey. accepted as Microdon polygaloides (L.f.) Druce, present
 Microdon dubius (L.) Hilliard, endemic
 Microdon linearis Choisy, endemic
 Microdon nitidus (E.Mey.) Hilliard, endemic
 Microdon orbicularis Choisy, endemic
 Microdon parviflorus (P.J.Bergius) Hilliard, endemic
 Microdon polygaloides (L.f.) Druce, endemic

Myoporum 
Genus Myoporum:
 Myoporum insulare R.Br. not indigenous, naturalised, invasive
 Myoporum laetum G.Forst. not indigenous, naturalised, invasive
 Myoporum montanum R.Br. not indigenous, naturalised, invasive
 Myoporum tenuifolium G.Forst. not indigenous, naturalised

Nemesia 
Genus Nemesia:
 Nemesia acornis K.E.Steiner, endemic
 Nemesia acuminata Benth. endemic
 Nemesia affinis Benth. endemic
 Nemesia albiflora N.E.Br. indigenous
 Nemesia anfracta Hiern, endemic
 Nemesia anisocarpa E.Mey. ex Benth. indigenous
 Nemesia arenifera Bester & H.M.Steyn, endemic
 Nemesia aurantia K.E.Steiner, endemic
 Nemesia azurea Diels, endemic
 Nemesia barbata (Thunb.) Benth. endemic
 Nemesia bicornis (L.) Pers., endemic
 Nemesia bodkinii Bolus, endemic
 Nemesia brevicalcarata Schltr. endemic
 Nemesia caerulea Hiern, indigenous
 Nemesia calcarata E.Mey. ex Benth. endemic
 Nemesia cheiranthus E.Mey. ex Benth. endemic
 Nemesia chrysolopha Diels, endemic
 Nemesia cynanchifolia Benth. indigenous
 Nemesia deflexa Grant ex K.E.Steiner, endemic
 Nemesia denticulata (Benth.) Grant ex Fourc. endemic
 Nemesia diffusa Benth. indigenous
 Nemesia diffusa Benth. var. diffusa, endemic
 Nemesia diffusa Benth. var. rigida Benth. endemic
 Nemesia elata K.E.Steiner, indigenous
 Nemesia euryceras Schltr. endemic
 Nemesia fleckii Thell. indigenous
 Nemesia floribunda Lehm. indigenous
 Nemesia foetens Vent. accepted as Nemesia fruticans (Thunb.) Benth. indigenous
 Nemesia fourcadei K.E.Steiner, indigenous
 Nemesia fruticans (Thunb.) Benth. indigenous
 Nemesia glabriuscula Hilliard & B.L.Burtt, endemic
 Nemesia glaucescens Hiern, endemic
 Nemesia gracilis Benth. endemic
 Nemesia grandiflora Diels, endemic
 Nemesia guthriei Hiern, accepted as Nemesia barbata (Thunb.) Benth. present
 Nemesia hanoverica Hiern, endemic
 Nemesia hemiptera K.E.Steiner, endemic
 Nemesia ionantha Diels, endemic
 Nemesia karroensis Bond, endemic
 Nemesia lanceolata Hiern, endemic
 Nemesia leipoldtii Hiern, endemic
 Nemesia ligulata E.Mey. ex Benth. endemic
 Nemesia lilacina N.E.Br. indigenous
 Nemesia linearis Vent. indigenous
 Nemesia lucida Benth. endemic
 Nemesia macrocarpa (Aiton) Druce, endemic
 Nemesia macroceras Schltr. indigenous
 Nemesia macroceras Schltr. var. crocea Schltr. endemic
 Nemesia macroceras Schltr. var. macroceras, endemic
 Nemesia maxii Hiern, endemic
 Nemesia melissifolia Benth. indigenous
 Nemesia micrantha Hiern, endemic
 Nemesia pageae L.Bolus, endemic
 Nemesia pallida Hiern, endemic
 Nemesia parviflora Benth. indigenous
 Nemesia petiolina Hiern, endemic
 Nemesia picta Schltr. endemic
 Nemesia pinnata (L.f.) E.Mey. ex Benth. endemic
 Nemesia platysepala Diels, endemic
 Nemesia psammophila Schltr. endemic
 Nemesia pubescens Benth. indigenous
 Nemesia pubescens Benth. var. glabrior Benth. ex Hiern, endemic
 Nemesia pubescens Benth. var. pubescens, indigenous
 Nemesia pulchella Schltr. ex Hiern, endemic
 Nemesia rupicola Hilliard, indigenous
 Nemesia saccata E.Mey. ex Benth. endemic
 Nemesia silvatica Hilliard, endemic
 Nemesia strumosa (Banks ex Benth.) Benth. endemic
 Nemesia suaveolens K.E.Steiner, endemic
 Nemesia umbonata (Hiern) Hilliard & B.L.Burtt, indigenous
 Nemesia versicolor E.Mey. ex Benth., indigenous
 Nemesia versicolor E.Mey. ex Benth. var. oxyceras Benth. endemic
 Nemesia versicolor E.Mey. ex Benth. var. versicolor, endemic
 Nemesia viscosa E.Mey. ex Benth. indigenous
 Nemesia williamsonii K.E.Steiner, indigenous
 Nemesia zimbabwensis Rendle, indigenous

Nemia 
Genus Nemia:
 Nemia rubra P.J.Bergius, accepted as Manulea rubra (P.J.Bergius) L.f. present

Oftia 
Genus Oftia:
 Oftia africana (L.) Bocq. endemic
 Oftia glabra Compton, endemic
 Oftia revoluta (E.Mey.) Bocq. endemic

Peliostomum 
Genus Peliostomum:
 Peliostomum calycinum N.E.Br. indigenous
 Peliostomum junceum (Hiern) Kolberg & Van Slageren, indigenous
 Peliostomum leucorrhizum E.Mey. ex Benth. indigenous
 Peliostomum leucorrhizum E.Mey. ex Benth. var. grandiflorum Hiern, accepted as Peliostomum leucorrhizum E.Mey. ex Benth. endemic
 Peliostomum leucorrhizum E.Mey. ex Benth. var. junceum Hiern, accepted as Peliostomum junceum (Hiern) Kolberg & Van Slageren, indigenous
 Peliostomum leucorrhizum E.Mey. ex Benth. var. linearifolium (Schinz ex Kuntze) Emil Weber, accepted as Peliostomum leucorrhizum E.Mey. ex Benth. indigenous
 Peliostomum linearifolium Schinz ex Kuntze, accepted as Peliostomum leucorrhizum E.Mey. ex Benth. indigenous
 Peliostomum lugardiae N.E.Br. ex Hemsl. & Skan, accepted as Peliostomum leucorrhizum E.Mey. ex Benth. indigenous
 Peliostomum marlothii Engl. accepted as Aptosimum marlothii (Engl.) Hiern, indigenous
 Peliostomum oppositifolium Engl. accepted as Jamesbrittenia fruticosa (Benth.) Hilliard, present
 Peliostomum origanoides E.Mey. ex Benth. endemic
 Peliostomum scoparium E.Mey. ex Benth. accepted as Anticharis scoparia (E.Mey. ex Benth.) Hiern ex Benth. & Hook.f. indigenous
 Peliostomum virgatum E.Mey. ex Benth. indigenous
 Peliostomum viscosum E.Mey. ex Benth. indigenous

Phygelius 
Genus Phygelius:
 Phygelius aequalis Harv. ex Hiern, indigenous
 Phygelius capensis E.Mey. ex Benth. indigenous

Phyllopodium 
Genus Phyllopodium:
 Phyllopodium alpinum N.E.Br. endemic
 Phyllopodium anomalum Hilliard, endemic
 Phyllopodium bracteatum Benth. endemic
 Phyllopodium caespitosum Hilliard, endemic
 Phyllopodium capillare (L.f.) Hilliard, endemic
 Phyllopodium capitatum (L.f.) Benth. accepted as Phyllopodium heterophyllum (L.f.) Benth. present
 Phyllopodium cephalophorum (Thunb.) Hilliard, endemic
 Phyllopodium collinum (Hiern) Hilliard, indigenous
 Phyllopodium cordatum (Thunb.) Hilliard, endemic
 Phyllopodium cuneifolium (L.f.) Benth. endemic
 Phyllopodium diffusum Benth. endemic
 Phyllopodium dolomiticum Hilliard, endemic
 Phyllopodium elegans (Choisy) Hilliard, endemic
 Phyllopodium heterophyllum (L.f.) Benth. endemic
 Phyllopodium hispidulum (Thell.) Hilliard, indigenous
 Phyllopodium lupuliforme (Thell.) Hilliard, endemic
 Phyllopodium maxii (Hiern) Hilliard, indigenous
 Phyllopodium micranthum (Schltr.) Hilliard, endemic
 Phyllopodium mimetes Hilliard, endemic
 Phyllopodium multifolium Hiern, endemic
 Phyllopodium namaense (Thell.) Hilliard, indigenous
 Phyllopodium phyllopodioides (Schltr.) Hilliard, endemic
 Phyllopodium pubiflorum Hilliard, endemic
 Phyllopodium pumilum Benth. indigenous
 Phyllopodium rustii (Rolfe) Hilliard, endemic
 Phyllopodium tweedense Hilliard, endemic
 Phyllopodium viscidissimum Hilliard, endemic

Polycarena 
Genus Polycarena:
 Polycarena aemulans Hilliard, endemic
 Polycarena aethiopica (L.) Druce, accepted as Chaenostoma aethiopicum (L.) Benth. 
 Polycarena alpina (N.E.Br.) Levyns, accepted as Phyllopodium alpinum N.E.Br. present
 Polycarena arenaria Hiern, accepted as Polycarena pubescens Benth. present
 Polycarena aurea Benth. endemic
 Polycarena batteniana Hilliard, endemic
 Polycarena capensis (L.) Benth. endemic
 Polycarena comptonii Hilliard, endemic
 Polycarena exigua Hilliard, endemic
 Polycarena filiformis Diels, endemic
 Polycarena formosa Hilliard, endemic
 Polycarena gilioides Benth. endemic
 Polycarena glaucescens Hiern, accepted as Polycarena pubescens Benth. present
 Polycarena gracilipes N.E.Br. ex Hiern, accepted as Polycarena filiformis Diels, present
 Polycarena gracilis Hilliard, endemic
 Polycarena leipoldtii Hiern, accepted as Polycarena rariflora Benth. present
 Polycarena lilacina Hilliard, indigenous
 Polycarena lilacina Hilliard var. difficilis Hilliard, endemic
 Polycarena lilacina Hilliard var. lilacina, endemic
 Polycarena multifolia (Hiern) Levyns, accepted as Phyllopodium multifolium Hiern, present
 Polycarena nardouwensis Hilliard, endemic
 Polycarena pubescens Benth. indigenous
 Polycarena pumila (Benth.) Levyns, accepted as Phyllopodium pumilum Benth. present
 Polycarena rariflora Benth. endemic
 Polycarena silenoides Harv. ex Benth. endemic
 Polycarena sordida (Hiern) Levyns, accepted as Manulea augei (Hiern) Hilliard, present
 Polycarena subtilis Hilliard, endemic
 Polycarena tenella Hiern, endemic

Pseudoselago 
Genus Pseudoselago:
 Pseudoselago arguta (E.Mey.) Hilliard, endemic
 Pseudoselago ascendens (E.Mey.) Hilliard, endemic
 Pseudoselago bella Hilliard, endemic
 Pseudoselago burmannii (Choisy) Hilliard, endemic
 Pseudoselago caerulescens Hilliard, endemic
 Pseudoselago candida Hilliard, endemic
 Pseudoselago densifolia (Hochst.) Hilliard, endemic
 Pseudoselago diplotricha Hilliard, endemic
 Pseudoselago gracilis Hilliard, endemic
 Pseudoselago guttata (E.Mey.) Hilliard, endemic
 Pseudoselago hilliardiae J.C.Manning & Goldblatt, indigenous
 Pseudoselago humilis (Rolfe) Hilliard, endemic
 Pseudoselago langebergensis Hilliard, endemic
 Pseudoselago outeniquensis Hilliard, endemic
 Pseudoselago parvifolia Hilliard, endemic
 Pseudoselago peninsulae Hilliard, endemic
 Pseudoselago prolixa Hilliard, endemic
 Pseudoselago prostrata Hilliard, endemic
 Pseudoselago pulchra Hilliard, endemic
 Pseudoselago quadrangularis (Choisy) Hilliard, endemic
 Pseudoselago rapunculoides (L.) Hilliard, endemic
 Pseudoselago recurvifolia Hilliard, endemic
 Pseudoselago serrata (P.J.Bergius) Hilliard, endemic
 Pseudoselago similis Hilliard, endemic
 Pseudoselago spuria (L.) Hilliard, endemic
 Pseudoselago subglabra Hilliard, endemic
 Pseudoselago verbenacea (L.f.) Hilliard, endemic
 Pseudoselago violacea Hilliard, endemic

Reyemia 
Genus Reyemia:
 Reyemia chasmanthiflora Hilliard, accepted as Zaluzianskya chasmanthiflora (Hilliard) J.C.Manning & Goldblatt, endemic
 Reyemia nemesioides (Diels) Hilliard, accepted as Zaluzianskya nemesioides Diels, endemic

Selago 
Genus Selago:
 Selago acocksii Hilliard, endemic
 Selago acutibractea Hilliard, indigenous
 Selago adenodes Hilliard, endemic
 Selago adpressa Choisy, accepted as Globulariopsis adpressa (Choisy) Hilliard, present
 Selago albida Choisy, indigenous
 Selago albomarginata Hilliard, indigenous
 Selago albomontana Hilliard, endemic
 Selago angustibractea Hilliard, indigenous
 Selago articulata Thunb. endemic
 Selago ascendens E.Mey. accepted as Pseudoselago ascendens (E.Mey.) Hilliard, present
 Selago aspera Choisy, endemic
 Selago atherstonei Rolfe, endemic
 Selago barbula Harv. ex Rolfe, endemic
 Selago baurii (Hiern) Hilliard, endemic
 Selago beaniana Hilliard, endemic
 Selago bilacunosa Hilliard, endemic
 Selago bolusii Rolfe, endemic
 Selago brevifolia Rolfe, endemic
 Selago burchellii Rolfe, endemic
 Selago burkei Rolfe, endemic
 Selago burmannii Choisy, accepted as Pseudoselago burmannii (Choisy) Hilliard, present
 Selago canescens L.f. endemic
 Selago capitellata Schltr. endemic
 Selago capituliflora Rolfe, endemic
 Selago cecilae (Rolfe) Eyles, indigenous
 Selago cedrimontana Hilliard, endemic
 Selago centralis Hilliard, indigenous
 Selago chalarantha Hilliard, endemic
 Selago chongweënsis (Rolfe) Torre & Harms, accepted as Selago angolensis Rolfe, present
 Selago ciliata L.f. endemic
 Selago cinerea L.f., endemic
 Selago compacta Rolfe, indigenous
 Selago comptonii Hilliard, endemic
 Selago confusa Hilliard, endemic
 Selago congesta Rolfe, endemic
 Selago corymbosa L. endemic
 Selago crassifolia (Rolfe) Hilliard, endemic
 Selago cryptadenia Hilliard, endemic
 Selago cucullata Hilliard, indigenous
 Selago cupressoides Hilliard, endemic
 Selago curvifolia Rolfe, endemic
 Selago cylindrica Levyns, accepted as Selago scabrida Thunb. present
 Selago decipiens E.Mey. endemic
 Selago densiflora Rolfe, indigenous
 Selago densifolia Hochst., accepted as Pseudoselago densifolia (Hochst.) Hilliard, present
 Selago diabolica Hilliard, endemic
 Selago diffusa Thunb., endemic
 Selago dinteri Rolfe, indigenous
 Selago dinteri Rolfe subsp. pseudodinteri Hilliard, indigenous
 Selago diosmoides Rolfe, accepted as Selago diffusa Thunb., present
 Selago distans E.Mey., endemic
 Selago divaricata L.f. indigenous
 Selago dolichonema Hilliard, endemic
 Selago dolosa Hilliard, endemic
 Selago dregeana Hilliard, endemic
 Selago dregei Rolfe, accepted as Selago luxurians Choisy, present
 Selago eckloniana Choisy, endemic
 Selago elata Rolfe, accepted as Selago procera Hilliard, present
 Selago elongata Hilliard, endemic
 Selago elsiae Hilliard, endemic
 Selago esterhuyseniae Hilliard, endemic
 Selago exigua Hilliard, endemic
 Selago farrago Hilliard, endemic
 Selago ferruginea Rolfe, endemic
 Selago flanaganii Rolfe, indigenous
 Selago florifera Hilliard, endemic
 Selago foliosa Rolfe, endemic
 Selago forbesii Rolfe, accepted as Selago canescens L.f. present
 Selago fourcadei Hilliard, endemic
 Selago fruticosa L. endemic
 Selago fruticulosa Rolfe, accepted as Selago fruticosa L. present
 Selago galpinii Schltr. indigenous
 Selago geniculata L.f. endemic
 Selago glabrata Choisy, endemic
 Selago glandulosa Choisy, endemic
 Selago gloiodes Hilliard, endemic
 Selago glomerata Thunb. endemic
 Selago glutinosa E.Mey. accepted as Selago dregeana Hilliard, indigenous
 Selago glutinosa E.Mey. subsp. cylindriphylla Hilliard, endemic
 Selago glutinosa E.Mey. subsp. glutinosa, endemic
 Selago gracilis (Rolfe) Hilliard, endemic
 Selago grandiceps Hilliard, endemic
 Selago griquana Hilliard, endemic
 Selago guttata E.Mey. accepted as Pseudoselago guttata (E.Mey.) Hilliard, present
 Selago herbacea Choisy, accepted as Phyllopodium cuneifolium (L.f.) Benth. present
 Selago hermannioides E.Mey. endemic
 Selago heterotricha Hilliard, endemic
 Selago hispida L.f., endemic
 Selago hoepfneri Rolfe, accepted as Selago welwitschii Rolfe var. welwitschii, present
 Selago humilis Rolfe, accepted as Pseudoselago humilis (Rolfe) Hilliard, present
 Selago hyssopifolia E.Mey. accepted as Selago tarachodes Hilliard, indigenous
 Selago hyssopifolia E.Mey. subsp. hyssopifolia, endemic
 Selago hyssopifolia E.Mey. subsp. retrotricha Hilliard, endemic
 Selago immersa Rolfe, endemic
 Selago impedita Hilliard, endemic
 Selago inaequifolia Hilliard, endemic
 Selago incisa Hochst. accepted as Pseudoselago ascendens (E.Mey.) Hilliard, present
 Selago inconstans Hilliard, endemic
 Selago innata Markotter, indigenous
 Selago intermedia Hilliard, endemic
 Selago junodii Rolfe, accepted as Selago rehmannii Rolfe, present
 Selago karooica Hilliard, endemic
 Selago lacunosa Klotzsch, indigenous
 Selago lamprocarpa Schltr. ex Rolfe, endemic
 Selago lamprocarpa Schltr. ex Rolfe var. major Schltr. ex Rolfe, accepted as Selago oresigena Compton, present
 Selago laxiflora Choisy, accepted as Globulariopsis tephrodes (E.Mey.) Hilliard, present
 Selago lepidioides Rolfe, accepted as Selago peduncularis E.Mey. present
 Selago leptothrix Hilliard, endemic
 Selago levynsiae Hilliard, endemic
 Selago lilacina Hilliard, endemic
 Selago linearifolia Rolfe, endemic
 Selago linearis Rolfe, endemic
 Selago lobeliacea Hochst. accepted as Pseudoselago peninsulae Hilliard, present
 Selago longicalyx Hilliard, endemic
 Selago longiflora Rolfe, endemic
 Selago longipedicellata Rolfe, endemic
 Selago luxurians Choisy, endemic
 Selago lydenburgensis Rolfe, endemic
 Selago magnakarooica Hilliard, endemic
 Selago marlothii Hilliard, endemic
 Selago mediocris Hilliard, endemic
 Selago melliodora Hilliard, indigenous
 Selago michelliae Hilliard, endemic
 Selago micradenia Hilliard, endemic
 Selago minutissima Choisy, accepted as Selago divaricata L.f. present
 Selago mixta Hilliard, endemic
 Selago monticola J.M.Wood & M.S.Evans, endemic
 Selago montis-shebae Brenan, accepted as Tetraselago longituba (Rolfe) Hilliard & B.L.Burtt, present
 Selago morrisii Rolfe, endemic
 Selago mucronata Hilliard, endemic
 Selago muddii Rolfe, accepted as Selago atherstonei Rolfe, present
 Selago multiflora Hilliard, endemic
 Selago multispicata Hilliard, indigenous
 Selago mundii Rolfe, endemic
 Selago myriophylla Hilliard, endemic
 Selago myrtifolia Rchb. endemic
 Selago namaquensis Schltr. endemic
 Selago neglecta Hilliard, endemic
 Selago nigrescens Rolfe, endemic
 Selago nigromontana Hilliard, endemic
 Selago oppositifolia Hilliard, endemic
 Selago oresigena Compton, endemic
 Selago ovata Rolfe, accepted as Selago pinguicula E.Mey. present
 Selago pachypoda Rolfe, endemic
 Selago paniculata Thunb. endemic
 Selago parvibractea Hilliard, endemic
 Selago peduncularis E.Mey. endemic
 Selago pentheri Gand. accepted as Pseudoselago serrata (P.J.Bergius) Hilliard, present
 Selago perplexa Hilliard, endemic
 Selago persimilis Hilliard, endemic
 Selago pinea Link, endemic
 Selago pinguicula E.Mey. endemic
 Selago polycephala Otto ex Walp. endemic
 Selago polygala S.Moore, endemic
 Selago polystachya L. endemic
 Selago praetermissa Hilliard, endemic
 Selago procera Hilliard, indigenous
 Selago prostrata Hilliard, endemic
 Selago psammophila Hilliard, endemic
 Selago pubescens Rolfe, accepted as Selago burchellii Rolfe, present
 Selago pulchra Hilliard, endemic
 Selago punctata Rolfe, endemic
 Selago pustulosa Hilliard, endemic
 Selago quadrangularis Choisy, accepted as Pseudoselago quadrangularis (Choisy) Hilliard, present
 Selago ramosissima Rolfe, endemic
 Selago ramulosa E.Mey., accepted as Selago canescens L.f. present
 Selago recurva E.Mey. endemic
 Selago rehmannii Rolfe, endemic
 Selago retropilosa Hilliard, endemic
 Selago rigida Rolfe, endemic
 Selago robusta Rolfe, accepted as Selago pinguicula E.Mey. present
 Selago rotundifolia L.f. endemic
 Selago rubromontana Hilliard, endemic
 Selago rudolphii (Hiern) Levyns, accepted as Pseudoselago humilis (Rolfe) Hilliard, present
 Selago saundersiae Rolfe, accepted as Selago capitellata Schltr. present
 Selago saxatilis E.Mey. indigenous
 Selago scabribractea Hilliard, endemic
 Selago scabrida Thunb. endemic
 Selago schlechteri Rolfe, accepted as Selago galpinii Schltr. 
 Selago serrata P.J.Bergius, accepted as Pseudoselago serrata (P.J.Bergius) Hilliard, present
 Selago seticaulis Hilliard, endemic
 Selago setulosa Rolfe, endemic
 Selago singularis Hilliard, endemic
 Selago speciosa Rolfe, indigenous
 Selago spectabilis Hilliard, endemic
 Selago spuria L. accepted as Pseudoselago spuria (L.) Hilliard, present
 Selago stenostachya Hilliard, endemic
 Selago stewartiae S.Moore, indigenous
 Selago stricta P.J.Bergius, accepted as Globulariopsis stricta (P.J.Bergius) Hilliard, present
 Selago subspinosa Hilliard, endemic
 Selago tarachodes Hilliard, endemic
 Selago tenuifolia (Rolfe) Hilliard, endemic
 Selago tenuis E.Mey. endemic
 Selago tephrodes E.Mey., accepted as Globulariopsis tephrodes (E.Mey.) Hilliard, present
 Selago thermalis Hilliard, endemic
 Selago thomii Rolfe, endemic
 Selago thunbergii Choisy, accepted as Selago canescens L.f. present
 Selago transvaalensis Rolfe, accepted as Tetraselago nelsonii (Rolfe) Hilliard & B.L.Burtt, present
 Selago trauseldii Killick, endemic
 Selago trichophylla Hilliard, endemic
 Selago trinervia E.Mey. endemic
 Selago triquetra L.f., endemic
 Selago valliscitri Hilliard, endemic
 Selago variicalyx Hilliard, endemic
 Selago venosa Hilliard, endemic
 Selago verbenacea L.f. accepted as Pseudoselago verbenacea (L.f.) Hilliard, present
 Selago verna Hilliard, endemic
 Selago villicalyx Rolfe, accepted as Selago pachypoda Rolfe, present
 Selago villicaulis Rolfe, endemic
 Selago villosa Rolfe, indigenous
 Selago welwitschii Rolfe, indigenous
 Selago welwitschii Rolfe var. australis Hilliard, indigenous
 Selago welwitschii Rolfe var. holubii (Rolfe) Brenan, indigenous
 Selago witbergensis E.Mey. indigenous
 Selago wittebergensis Compton, accepted as Globulariopsis montana Hilliard, present
 Selago woodii Rolfe, accepted as Selago peduncularis E.Mey. present
 Selago zeyheri Choisy, endemic
 Selago zeyheri Rolfe, accepted as Selago acocksii Hilliard, present
 Selago zuluensis Hilliard, endemic

Sphenandra 
Genus Sphenandra:
 Sphenandra cinerea Engl. accepted as Chaenostoma halimifolium Benth. 
 Sphenandra coerulea (L.f.) Kuntze, accepted as Chaenostoma caeruleum (L.f.) Kornhall 
 Sphenandra viscosa (Aiton) Benth. accepted as Chaenostoma caeruleum (L.f.) Kornhall

Strobilopsis 
Genus Strobilopsis:
 Strobilopsis wrightii Hilliard & B.L.Burtt, indigenous

Sutera 
Genus Sutera:
 Sutera accrescens Hiern, accepted as Jamesbrittenia accrescens (Hiern) Hilliard, present
 Sutera acutiloba (Pilg.) Overkott ex Roessler, accepted as Jamesbrittenia acutiloba (Pilg.) Hilliard 
 Sutera adpressa Dinter, accepted as Jamesbrittenia adpressa (Dinter) Hilliard 
 Sutera aethiopica (L.) Kuntze, accepted as Chaenostoma aethiopicum (L.) Benth. endemic
 Sutera affinis (Bernh.) Kuntze, accepted as Chaenostoma affine Bernh. endemic
 Sutera albiflora I.Verd. accepted as Jamesbrittenia albiflora (I.Verd.) Hilliard, present
 Sutera altoplana Hiern, accepted as Jamesbrittenia tysonii (Hiern) Hilliard, present
 Sutera amplexicaulis (Benth.) Hiern, accepted as Jamesbrittenia amplexicaulis (Benth.) Hilliard, present
 Sutera antirrhinoides (L.f.) Hiern, accepted as Lyperia antirrhinoides (L.f.) Hilliard, present
 Sutera archeri Compton, accepted as Chaenostoma archeri (Compton) Kornhall, endemic
 Sutera arcuata Hiern, accepted as Chaenostoma floribundum Benth. present
 Sutera argentea (L.f.) Hiern, accepted as Jamesbrittenia argentea (L.f.) Hilliard, present
 Sutera asbestina Hiern, accepted as Jamesbrittenia integerrima (Benth.) Hilliard, present
 Sutera aspalathoides (Benth.) Hiern, accepted as Jamesbrittenia aspalathoides (Benth.) Hilliard, present
 Sutera atrocaerulea Fourc. accepted as Jamesbrittenia tenuifolia (Bernh.) Hilliard, present
 Sutera atropurpurea (Benth.) Hiern, accepted as Jamesbrittenia atropurpurea (Benth.) Hilliard subsp. atropurpurea, present
 Sutera aurantiaca (Burch.) Hiern, accepted as Jamesbrittenia aurantiaca (Burch.) Hilliard, present
 Sutera batlapina Hiern, accepted as Jamesbrittenia integerrima (Benth.) Hilliard 
 Sutera beverlyana Hilliard & B.L.Burtt, accepted as Jamesbrittenia beverlyana (Hilliard & B.L.Burtt) Hilliard 
 Sutera brachiata Roth, accepted as Chaenostoma hispidum (Thunb.) Benth. 
 Sutera bracteolata Hiern, accepted as Sutera cooperi Hiern, present
 Sutera burchellii Hiern, accepted as Sutera griquensis Hiern, present
 Sutera burkeana (Benth.) Hiern, accepted as Jamesbrittenia burkeana (Benth.) Hilliard, present
 Sutera caerulea (L.f.) Hiern, accepted as Chaenostoma caeruleum (L.f.) Kornhall, endemic
 Sutera calciphila Hilliard, accepted as Chaenostoma calciphilum (Hilliard) Kornhall, endemic
 Sutera calycina (Benth.) Kuntze, accepted as Chaenostoma calycinum Benth. endemic
 Sutera campanulata (Benth.) Kuntze, accepted as Chaenostoma campanulatum Benth. endemic
 Sutera canescens (Benth.) Hiern, accepted as Jamesbrittenia canescens (Benth.) Hilliard var. canescens, present
 Sutera cephalotes (Thunb.) Kuntze, accepted as Manulea cephalotes Thunb. present
 Sutera cephalotes Hiern, accepted as Chaenostoma aethiopicum (L.) Benth. 
 Sutera cephalotes Hiern var. glabrata Hiern, accepted as Chaenostoma aethiopicum (L.) Benth. 
 Sutera cinerea Hilliard, accepted as Chaenostoma cinereum (Hilliard) Kornhall, endemic
 Sutera compta Hiern, accepted as Chaenostoma floribundum Benth. present
 Sutera comptonii Hilliard, accepted as Chaenostoma comptonii (Hilliard) Kornhall, endemic
 Sutera concinna Hiern, accepted as Jamesbrittenia concinna (Hiern) Hilliard 
 Sutera cooperi Hiern, indigenous
 Sutera cordata (Thunb.) Kuntze, accepted as Chaenostoma cordatum (Thunb.) Benth. endemic
 Sutera cordata (Thunb.) Kuntze var. hirsutior Hiern, accepted as Sutera cooperi Hiern, present
 Sutera corymbosa (Marloth & Engl.) Hiern, accepted as Camptoloma rotundifolium Benth. 
 Sutera crassicaulis (Benth.) Hiern, accepted as Jamesbrittenia crassicaulis (Benth.) Hilliard, present
 Sutera cuneata (Benth.) Kuntze, accepted as Chaenostoma hispidum (Thunb.) Benth. 
 Sutera cymulosa Hiern, accepted as Sutera cooperi Hiern, present
 Sutera debilis Hutch. accepted as Chaenostoma debile (Hutch.) Kornhall, indigenous
 Sutera decipiens Hilliard, accepted as Chaenostoma decipiens (Hilliard) Kornhall, endemic
 Sutera densifolia Hiern, accepted as Jamesbrittenia microphylla (L.f.) Hilliard, present
 Sutera dentatisepala Overkott, accepted as Jamesbrittenia dentatisepala (Overkott) Hilliard, present
 Sutera denudata (Benth.) Kuntze, accepted as Chaenostoma denudatum Benth. endemic
 Sutera divaricata (Diels) Hiern, accepted as Manulea annua (Hiern) Hilliard, present
 Sutera elegantissima (Schinz) Skan, accepted as Jamesbrittenia elegantissima (Schinz) Hilliard 
 Sutera esculenta Bond, accepted as Jamesbrittenia incisa (Thunb.) Hilliard, present
 Sutera fastigiata (Benth.) Druce, accepted as Chaenostoma aethiopicum (L.) Benth. present
 Sutera filicaulis (Benth.) Hiern, accepted as Jamesbrittenia filicaulis (Benth.) Hilliard, present
 Sutera flexuosa Hiern, accepted as Jamesbrittenia tenella (Hiern) Hilliard, present
 Sutera floribunda (Benth.) Kuntze, accepted as Chaenostoma floribundum Benth. indigenous
 Sutera foetida Roth, endemic
 Sutera foliolosa (Benth.) Hiern, accepted as Jamesbrittenia foliolosa (Benth.) Hilliard, present
 Sutera fragilis Pilg. accepted as Jamesbrittenia fragilis (Pilg.) Hilliard 
 Sutera fraterna Hiern, accepted as Jamesbrittenia thunbergii (G.Don) Hilliard, present
 Sutera fruticosa (Benth.) Hiern, accepted as Jamesbrittenia fruticosa (Benth.) Hilliard, present
 Sutera glabrata (Benth.) Kuntze, accepted as Chaenostoma glabratum Benth. endemic
 Sutera glandulifera Hilliard, accepted as Chaenostoma glanduliferum (Hilliard) Kornhall, endemic
 Sutera gracilis (Diels) Hiern, accepted as Jamesbrittenia thunbergii (G.Don) Hilliard, present
 Sutera grandiflora (Galpin) Hiern, accepted as Jamesbrittenia grandiflora (Galpin) Hilliard, present
 Sutera griquensis Hiern, endemic
 Sutera halimifolia (Benth.) Kuntze, accepted as Chaenostoma halimifolium Benth. indigenous
 Sutera henrici Hiern, accepted as Jamesbrittenia filicaulis (Benth.) Hilliard, present
 Sutera hereroensis (Engl.) Skan, accepted as Jamesbrittenia hereroensis (Engl.) Hilliard 
 Sutera hispida (Thunb.) Druce, accepted as Chaenostoma hispidum (Thunb.) Benth. endemic
 Sutera humifusa Hiern, accepted as Chaenostoma platysepalum (Hiern) Kornhall, present
 Sutera impedita Hilliard, accepted as Chaenostoma impeditum (Hilliard) Kornhall, endemic
 Sutera incisa (Thunb.) Hiern, accepted as Jamesbrittenia incisa (Thunb.) Hilliard, present
 Sutera infundibiliformis Schinz, accepted as Chaenostoma polyanthum Benth. present
 Sutera integerrima (Benth.) Hiern, accepted as Jamesbrittenia integerrima (Benth.) Hilliard, present
 Sutera integrifolia (L.f.) Kuntze, accepted as Chaenostoma integrifolium (L.f.) Benth. endemic
 Sutera integrifolia (L.f.) Kuntze var. parvifolia Hiern, accepted as Chaenostoma hispidum (Thunb.) Benth. present
 Sutera intertexta Hiern, accepted as Chaenostoma campanulatum Benth. present
 Sutera jurassica Hilliard & B.L.Burtt, accepted as Jamesbrittenia jurassica (Hilliard & B.L.Burtt) Hilliard 
 Sutera kraussiana (Bernh.) Hiern, accepted as Jamesbrittenia kraussiana (Bernh.) Hilliard, present
 Sutera langebergensis Hilliard, accepted as Chaenostoma langebergense (Hilliard) Kornhall, endemic
 Sutera latifolia Hiern, accepted as Sutera cooperi Hiern, present
 Sutera laxiflora (Benth.) Kuntze, accepted as Chaenostoma halimifolium Benth. present
 Sutera levis Hiern, accepted as Chaenostoma leve (Hiern) Kornhall, indigenous
 Sutera linifolia (Thunb.) Kuntze, accepted as Chaenostoma uncinatum (Desr.) Kornhall 
 Sutera longipedicellata Hilliard, accepted as Chaenostoma longipedicellatum (Hilliard) Kornhall, endemic
 Sutera lychnidea (L.) Hiern, accepted as Lyperia lychnidea (L.) Druce, present
 Sutera lyperioides (Engl.) Engl. ex Range, accepted as Jamesbrittenia lyperioides (Engl.) Hilliard 
 Sutera macleana Hiern, accepted as Chaenostoma floribundum Benth. present
 Sutera macrantha Codd, accepted as Jamesbrittenia macrantha (Codd) Hilliard, present
 Sutera macrosiphon (Schltr.) Hiern, accepted as Chaenostoma macrosiphon Schltr. endemic
 Sutera marifolia (Benth.) Kuntze, accepted as Chaenostoma marifolium Benth. endemic
 Sutera maritima Hiern, accepted as Jamesbrittenia maritima (Hiern) Hilliard, present
 Sutera maxii Hiern, accepted as Jamesbrittenia maxii (Hiern) Hilliard, present
 Sutera merxmuelleri Roessler, accepted as Jamesbrittenia merxmuelleri (Roessler) Hilliard 
 Sutera micrantha (Klotzsch) Hiern, accepted as Jamesbrittenia micrantha (Klotzsch) Hilliard, present
 Sutera microphylla (L.f.) Hiern, accepted as Jamesbrittenia microphylla (L.f.) Hilliard, present
 Sutera mollis (Benth.) Hiern, accepted as Jamesbrittenia pinnatifida (L.f.) Hilliard, present
 Sutera montana (Diels) S.Moore, accepted as Jamesbrittenia montana (Diels) Hilliard, present
 Sutera multiramosa Hilliard, accepted as Chaenostoma multiramosum (Hilliard) Kornhall, endemic
 Sutera natalensis (Bernh.) Kuntze, accepted as Chaenostoma floribundum Benth. present
 Sutera neglecta (J.M.Wood & M.S.Evans) Hiern, accepted as Chaenostoma neglectum J.M.Wood & M.S.Evans, indigenous
 Sutera noodsbergensis Hiern, accepted as Chaenostoma floribundum Benth. present
 Sutera ochracea Hiern, accepted as Lyperia antirrhinoides (L.f.) Hilliard, present
 Sutera oppositiflora (Vent.) Kuntze, accepted as Chaenostoma hispidum (Thunb.) Benth. 
 Sutera pallescens Hiern, accepted as Chaenostoma platysepalum (Hiern) Kornhall, present
 Sutera pallida (Pilg.) Overkott ex Roessler, accepted as Jamesbrittenia pallida (Pilg.) Hilliard 
 Sutera palustris Hiern, accepted as Chaenostoma leve (Hiern) Kornhall, present
 Sutera paniculata Hilliard, accepted as Chaenostoma paniculatum (Hilliard) Kornhall, endemic
 Sutera patriotica Hiern, accepted as Chaenostoma patrioticum (Hiern) Kornhall, indigenous
 Sutera pauciflora (Benth.) Kuntze, accepted as Chaenostoma pauciflorum Benth. endemic
 Sutera pedunculata (Andrews) Hiern, accepted as Jamesbrittenia argentea (L.f.) Hilliard, present
 Sutera pedunculosa (Benth.) Kuntze, accepted as Jamesbrittenia pedunculosa (Benth.) Hilliard, present
 Sutera phlogiflora (Benth.) Hiern, accepted as Jamesbrittenia phlogiflora (Benth.) Hilliard, present
 Sutera placida Hilliard, accepted as Chaenostoma placidum (Hilliard) Kornhall, endemic
 Sutera platysepala Hiern, accepted as Chaenostoma platysepalum (Hiern) Kornhall, endemic
 Sutera polelensis Hiern subsp. fraterna Hilliard, accepted as Chaenostoma polelense (Hiern) Kornhall subsp. fraterna (Hilliard) Kornhall, indigenous
 Sutera polelensis Hiern subsp. polelensis, accepted as Chaenostoma polelense (Hiern) Kornhall subsp. polelense, indigenous
 Sutera polyantha (Benth.) Kuntze, accepted as Chaenostoma polyanthum Benth. endemic
 Sutera polysepala Hiern, accepted as Chaenostoma calycinum Benth. present
 Sutera pristisepala Hiern, accepted as Jamesbrittenia pristisepala (Hiern) Hilliard, present
 Sutera procumbens (Benth.) Kuntze, accepted as Chaenostoma polyanthum Benth. present
 Sutera pulchra Norl. accepted as Chaenostoma floribundum Benth. 
 Sutera pumila (Benth.) Kuntze, accepted as Chaenostoma halimifolium Benth. 
 Sutera racemosa (Benth.) Kuntze, accepted as Chaenostoma racemosum Benth., endemic
 Sutera ramosissima Hiern, accepted as Jamesbrittenia ramosissima (Hiern) Hilliard, present
 Sutera revoluta (Thunb.) Kuntze, accepted as Chaenostoma revolutum (Thunb.) Benth. endemic
 Sutera rhombifolia Schinz, accepted as Jamesbrittenia argentea (L.f.) Hilliard, present
 Sutera roseoflava Hiern, accepted as Chaenostoma roseoflavum (Hiern) Kornhall, endemic
 Sutera rotundifolia (Benth.) Kuntze, accepted as Chaenostoma rotundifolium Benth. endemic
 Sutera sessilifolia (Diels) Hiern, accepted as Jamesbrittenia sessilifolia (Diels) Hilliard 
 Sutera silenoides Hilliard, accepted as Jamesbrittenia silenoides (Hilliard) Hilliard, present
 Sutera squarrosa (Pilg.) Hiern ex Range, accepted as Jamesbrittenia integerrima (Benth.) Hilliard, present
 Sutera stenopetala (Diels) Hiern, accepted as Jamesbrittenia incisa (Thunb.) Hilliard, present
 Sutera stenophylla Hiern, accepted as Chaenostoma subnudum N.E.Br. present
 Sutera subnuda (N.E.Br.) Hiern, accepted as Chaenostoma subnudum N.E.Br. endemic
 Sutera subsessilis Hilliard, accepted as Chaenostoma subsessile (Hilliard) Kornhall, endemic
 Sutera subspicata (Benth.) Kuntze, accepted as Chaenostoma subspicatum Benth. endemic
 Sutera tenella Hiern, accepted as Jamesbrittenia tenella (Hiern) Hilliard, present
 Sutera tenuicaulis Hilliard, accepted as Chaenostoma tenuicaule (Hilliard) Kornhall, endemic
 Sutera tenuiflora (Benth.) Hiern, accepted as Lyperia tenuiflora Benth. present
 Sutera tenuifolia (Bernh.) Fourc. accepted as Jamesbrittenia tenuifolia (Bernh.) Hilliard, present
 Sutera tenuis Pilg. accepted as Jamesbrittenia concinna (Hiern) Hilliard 
 Sutera titanophila Hilliard, accepted as Chaenostoma titanophilum (Hilliard) Kornhall, endemic
 Sutera tomentosa Hiern, accepted as Jamesbrittenia glutinosa (Benth.) Hilliard, present
 Sutera tortuosa (Benth.) Hiern, accepted as Jamesbrittenia tortuosa (Benth.) Hilliard, present
 Sutera tristis (L.f.) Hiern, accepted as Lyperia tristis (L.f.) Benth. present
 Sutera tysonii Hiern, accepted as Jamesbrittenia tysonii (Hiern) Hilliard, present
 Sutera uncinata (Desr.) Hilliard, accepted as Chaenostoma uncinatum (Desr.) Kornhall, endemic
 Sutera violacea (Schltr.) Hiern, accepted as Chaenostoma violaceum Schltr. endemic
 Sutera virgulosa Hiern, accepted as Jamesbrittenia filicaulis (Benth.) Hilliard, present

Teedia 
Genus Teedia:
 Teedia lucida (Sol.) Rudolphi, indigenous
 Teedia pubescens Burch. endemic

Tetraselago 
Genus Tetraselago:
 Tetraselago longituba (Rolfe) Hilliard & B.L.Burtt, indigenous
 Tetraselago natalensis (Rolfe) Junell, indigenous
 Tetraselago nelsonii (Rolfe) Hilliard & B.L.Burtt, endemic
 Tetraselago wilmsii (Rolfe) Hilliard & B.L.Burtt, endemic

Trieenea 
Genus Trieenea:
 Trieenea elsiae Hilliard, endemic
 Trieenea frigida Hilliard, endemic
 Trieenea glutinosa (Schltr.) Hilliard, endemic
 Trieenea lanciloba Hilliard, endemic
 Trieenea lasiocephala Hilliard, endemic
 Trieenea laxiflora Hilliard, endemic
 Trieenea longipedicellata Hilliard, endemic
 Trieenea occulta J.C.Manning & Goldblatt, endemic
 Trieenea schlechteri (Hiern) Hilliard, endemic
 Trieenea taylorii Hilliard, endemic

Verbascum 
Genus Verbascum:
 Verbascum blattaria L. not indigenous, naturalised
 Verbascum thapsus L. not indigenous, cultivated, naturalised, invasive
 Verbascum virgatum Stokes, not indigenous, naturalised, invasive

Walafrida 
Genus Walafrida:
 Walafrida albanensis (Schltr.) Rolfe, accepted as Selago recurva E.Mey. present
 Walafrida alopecuroides (Rolfe) Rolfe, accepted as Selago alopecuroides Rolfe 
 Walafrida angolensis (Rolfe) Rolfe, accepted as Selago angolensis Rolfe 
 Walafrida articulata (Thunb.) Rolfe, accepted as Selago articulata Thunb. present
 Walafrida basutica E.Phillips, accepted as Selago saxatilis E.Mey. present
 Walafrida ciliata (L.f.) Rolfe, accepted as Selago ciliata L.f. present
 Walafrida cinerea (L.f.) Rolfe, accepted as Selago cinerea L.f., present
 Walafrida congesta (Rolfe) Rolfe, accepted as Selago congesta Rolfe, present
 Walafrida crassifolia Rolfe, accepted as Selago crassifolia (Rolfe) Hilliard, present
 Walafrida decipiens (E.Mey.) Rolfe, accepted as Selago decipiens E.Mey. present
 Walafrida densiflora (Rolfe) Rolfe, accepted as Selago densiflora Rolfe, present
 Walafrida diffusa Rolfe, accepted as Selago linearis Rolfe, present
 Walafrida distans (E.Mey.) Rolfe, accepted as Selago distans E.Mey., present
 Walafrida geniculata (L.f.) Rolfe, accepted as Selago geniculata L.f. present
 Walafrida gracilis Rolfe, accepted as Selago gracilis (Rolfe) Hilliard, present
 Walafrida loganii Hutch. accepted as Selago rigida Rolfe, present
 Walafrida macowani Rolfe, accepted as Selago decipiens E.Mey. present
 Walafrida merxmuelleri Roessler, accepted as Selago divaricata L.f. 
 Walafrida micrantha (Choisy) Rolfe, accepted as Selago paniculata Thunb. present
 Walafrida myrtifolia (Rchb.) Rolfe, accepted as Selago myrtifolia Rchb. present
 Walafrida nachtigalii (Rolfe) Rolfe, accepted as Selago nachtigalii Rolfe, present
 Walafrida nitida E.Mey. accepted as Selago myrtifolia Rchb. present
 Walafrida paniculata (Thunb.) Rolfe, accepted as Selago paniculata Thunb. present
 Walafrida polycephala (Otto ex Walp.) Rolfe, accepted as Selago polycephala Otto ex Walp. present
 Walafrida polystachya Rolfe, accepted as Selago densiflora Rolfe, present
 Walafrida polystachya Rolfe, accepted as Selago multispicata Hilliard 
 Walafrida pubescens Rolfe, accepted as Selago gracilis (Rolfe) Hilliard, present
 Walafrida recurva (E.Mey.) Rolfe, accepted as Selago recurva E.Mey. present
 Walafrida rigida (Rolfe) Hutch. accepted as Selago rigida Rolfe, present
 Walafrida rotundifolia (L.f.) Rolfe, accepted as Selago rotundifolia L.f. present
 Walafrida saxatilis (E.Mey.) Rolfe, accepted as Selago saxatilis E.Mey. present
 Walafrida schinzii Rolfe, accepted as Selago alopecuroides Rolfe 
 Walafrida squarrosa Rolfe, accepted as Selago gracilis (Rolfe) Hilliard, present
 Walafrida tenuifolia Rolfe, accepted as Selago tenuifolia (Rolfe) Hilliard, present
 Walafrida witbergensis (E.Mey.) Rolfe, accepted as Selago witbergensis E.Mey. present
 Walafrida zeyheri (Choisy) Rolfe, accepted as Selago zeyheri Choisy, present
 Walafrida zuurbergensis Rolfe, accepted as Selago zeyheri Choisy, present

Zaluzianskya 
Genus Zaluzianskya:
 Zaluzianskya acrobareia Hilliard, endemic
 Zaluzianskya acutiloba Hilliard, endemic
 Zaluzianskya affinis Hilliard, endemic
 Zaluzianskya africana Hiern, accepted as Zaluzianskya pumila (Benth.) Walp. present
 Zaluzianskya angustifolia Hilliard & B.L.Burtt, endemic
 Zaluzianskya aschersoniana Schinz, accepted as Zaluzianskya benthamiana Walp. present
 Zaluzianskya bella Hilliard, endemic
 Zaluzianskya benthamiana Walp. indigenous
 Zaluzianskya capensis (L.) Walp. endemic
 Zaluzianskya chasmanthiflora (Hilliard) J.C.Manning & Goldblatt, endemic
 Zaluzianskya chrysops Hilliard & B.L.Burtt, indigenous
 Zaluzianskya cohabitans Hilliard, endemic
 Zaluzianskya collina Hiern, endemic
 Zaluzianskya crocea Schltr. indigenous
 Zaluzianskya diandra Diels, indigenous
 Zaluzianskya distans Hiern, endemic
 Zaluzianskya divaricata (Thunb.) Walp. endemic
 Zaluzianskya elongata Hilliard & B.L.Burtt, indigenous
 Zaluzianskya falciloba Diels, accepted as Zaluzianskya pumila (Benth.) Walp. present
 Zaluzianskya gilgiana Diels, accepted as Zaluzianskya violacea Schltr. present
 Zaluzianskya gilioides Schltr. accepted as Zaluzianskya peduncularis (Benth.) Walp. present
 Zaluzianskya glandulosa Hilliard, endemic
 Zaluzianskya glareosa Hilliard & B.L.Burtt, indigenous
 Zaluzianskya gracilis Hilliard, endemic
 Zaluzianskya inflata Diels, endemic
 Zaluzianskya isanthera Hilliard, endemic
 Zaluzianskya kareebergensis Hilliard, endemic
 Zaluzianskya karrooica Hilliard, endemic
 Zaluzianskya katharinae Hiern, endemic
 Zaluzianskya lanigera Hilliard, endemic
 Zaluzianskya maritima (L.f.) Walp. endemic
 Zaluzianskya marlothii Hilliard, endemic
 Zaluzianskya microsiphon (Kuntze) K.Schum. indigenous
 Zaluzianskya minima (Hiern) Hilliard, endemic
 Zaluzianskya mirabilis Hilliard, endemic
 Zaluzianskya muirii Hilliard & B.L.Burtt, endemic
 Zaluzianskya natalensis Bernh. indigenous
 Zaluzianskya nemesioides Diels, endemic
 Zaluzianskya ovata (Benth.) Walp. indigenous
 Zaluzianskya pachyrrhiza Hilliard & B.L.Burtt, endemic
 Zaluzianskya parviflora Hilliard, endemic
 Zaluzianskya peduncularis (Benth.) Walp. indigenous
 Zaluzianskya pilosa Hilliard & B.L.Burtt, endemic
 Zaluzianskya pilosissima Hilliard, endemic
 Zaluzianskya pulvinata Killick, indigenous
 Zaluzianskya pumila (Benth.) Walp. endemic
 Zaluzianskya pusilla (Benth.) Walp. endemic
 Zaluzianskya ramosa Schinz ex Hiern, accepted as Zaluzianskya benthamiana Walp. present
 Zaluzianskya regalis J.C.Manning & Goldblatt, endemic
 Zaluzianskya rubrostellata Hilliard & B.L.Burtt, indigenous
 Zaluzianskya sanorum Hilliard, endemic
 Zaluzianskya schmitziae Hilliard & B.L.Burtt, indigenous
 Zaluzianskya spathacea (Benth.) Walp. indigenous
 Zaluzianskya sutherlandica Hilliard, endemic
 Zaluzianskya synaptica Hilliard, endemic
 Zaluzianskya turritella Hilliard & B.L.Burtt, indigenous
 Zaluzianskya vallispiscis Hilliard, endemic
 Zaluzianskya venusta Hilliard, endemic
 Zaluzianskya villosa F.W.Schmidt, endemic
 Zaluzianskya violacea Schltr. endemic

References

South African plant biodiversity lists
Scrophulariaceae